Irina Vsevolodovna Murzaeva (May 15, 1906   —  January 3, 1988) was a Soviet actress of theater and cinema.

Biography
She graduated from the Lunacharsky Theater College  (1927). In 1927-1928 and 1930-1931 an actress Sverdlovsk Youth Theater, in 1928-1937   Ruben Simonov's theater studio, in 1937-1956 an actress and director of  Moscow Lenkom Theatre.

In the movie she made her debut in the film Four Hearts by Konstantin Yudin. Repeatedly shot in the newsreels Yeralash and Fitil.

One of the most popular  comic old women  of Soviet cinema.

She died on January 3, 1988, in Moscow at the age of 82. Buried in Moscow in the Don Cemetery.

Personal life
Son  Boris Nikolayevich Murzaev (1938), who was brought up alone; grandson    Igor Murzaev (1975), granddaughter   Yekaterina Lazareva (1968), great-grandsons   Boris (1999), Tamara (1999), Mikhail (2002).

Selected filmography
 Four Hearts (1941) as  Tamara Spiridonovna, manicurist
 The Wedding (1944) as  guest
 The Call of Love (1944) as  Alla Vladimirovna Broshkina
 The Anna Cross (1954)  as Mavra Grigorievna
 The Snow Queen (1957) as old fairy (voice)
 Ekaterina Voronina (1957) as Kaleria Ivanovna
 The Girl Without an Address (1957) as conductor
 A Simple Story (1960) as  Sasha's mother
 The Night Before Christmas (1961) as deaconess
 Children of Don Quixote (1966) as old woman
 Torrents of Steel (1967) as Gorpina 
 Fire, Water, and Brass Pipes (1968) as  2nd guest at the wedding
 Shine, Shine, My Star (1970) as  Tapera
 The Twelve Chairs (1971) as  guide
 Grandads-Robbers (1972) as  the museum keeper
 Northern Rhapsody  (1974) as hockey fan
 Practical Joke (1977) as neighbor Fira Solomonovna
 Incognito from St. Petersburg (1978) as elderly lady
 Investigation Held by ZnaToKi (1987) as Tatyana Grigoryevna

References

External links
 
 Новейшая история отечественного кино

1906 births
1988 deaths
People from Sverdlovsk Oblast
People from Krasnoufimsky Uyezd
Soviet film actresses
Soviet stage actresses
Soviet television actresses
Russian Academy of Theatre Arts alumni